Orthosia miniosa, the blossom underwing, is a moth of the family Noctuidae. The species was first described by Michael Denis and Ignaz Schiffermüller in 1775. It is found in Europe.

Technical description and variation

The wingspan is 31–36 mm. The length of the forewings is 15–17 mm. Forewing sandy rufous, black speckled, median area generally deeper rufous: lines browner, edged with pale, the outer dentate lunulate; stigmata with yellowish outlines and grey centres: submarginal line rufous and yellowish: hindwing white, rosy tinged along the termen; cellspot, outer line, and veins sometimes well-marked. Form rubricosa Esper is the form in which the red of the median area is most emphasised. 
Form pallida Tutt is greyish ochreous, with hardly a vestige of rufous: in virgata Tutt, while the basal and marginal areas are grey, the median space is rufous.

Biology

The moth flies in one generation from the end of March to mid-May.

Larva pale or dark blue grey; dorsal and subdorsal lines yellow; the sides black with a yellow spiracular line, marked with a white spot on each segment; head whitish with coarse blackish mottling. The larvae feed on various trees and shrubs, mainly oak.

Notes
The flight season refers to Belgium and the Netherlands. This may vary in other parts of the range.

References

External links

 Taxonomy
Lepiforum e. V. 
De Vlinderstichting 

Orthosia
Moths described in 1775
Moths of Europe
Taxa named by Michael Denis
Taxa named by Ignaz Schiffermüller